NKA may refer to:
 "Now known as"
 "No known allergies" in medical jargon
 Initialism for North Korean Army, also known as the Korean People's Army
 Na+/K+-ATPase, an enzyme located in the plasma membrane in all animals
 Karate Canada, previously the "National Karate Association" of Canada
 New Kosovo Alliance, a political party
 Neurokinin A, a neurologically active peptide that seems to be involved in reactions to pain and the inflammatory responses